80 Medium Regiment is part of the Regiment of Artillery of the Indian Army.

Formation 
80 Medium Regiment was raised on 1 March 1965 at Chardwar under the command of Lieutenant Colonel NGK Nair.

Equipment
The regiment has been equipped with 130 mm guns since 2012. Prior to 2012, the regiment had the following guns in the chronological order- 
3.7 inch gun
75/24 pack howitzer
25-pounder gun 
122 mm howitzer
105 mm light field gun
Indian Field Gun

Operations
The regiment has taken part in the following operations –
 Indo-Pakistani War of 1965: In the nascent days of the regiment, when the guns and equipment were yet to be issued, a company strong column under Major SK Verma saw action in Golakganj in an infantry role.
 Operation Meghdoot: 
In 1984, 2nd Lieutenant DS Bisht was tasked to occupy the observation post at Siachen glacier. Before he could reach the location, he was informed that the post was occupied by the Pakistan Army. He engaged the enemy using mortars providing effective artillery fire to destroy them. He was subsequently awarded the Sena Medal.
Two gun detachments of the regiment were heli-dropped and assembled under the guidance of Captain Vijay Kohli. These guns occupied the highest known gun position in the world at 18,000 feet.
In 2002, Captain Badal Singh Sikarwar was posthumously awarded the Sena Medal for his gallant action, when he destroyed an enemy mortar position and a heavy machine gun post. 
 Operation Kasba : In August – September 1991, the unit was deployed in Poonch sector to provide fire support to the infantry engaged in evicting Pakistani troops who had crossed the Line of Control into the Kasba village. The regiment carried guns along mountainous terrain and was especially effective on the night of 1/2 September 1991. It supported 93 Infantry Brigade and 192 Mountain Brigade for the re-capture of Kirni village between 28 August and 3 September 1991. During these operations, Havildar S Nagarajan was awarded the Sena Medal and Gunner Virupaxappa was awarded the COAS Commendation Card. 
 Operation Vijay : The regiment was part of an Infantry Division during the Kargil war.
 In 2001, the regiment was inducted into the Nowshera sector, where it provided artillery fire support at the Line of Control.
 In 2011, the regiment was located at Gangtok and occupied the highest observation post in the Eastern sector. It was also responsible for raising four porter companies. The regiment provided timely assistance and relief during the earthquake which hit Sikkim on 18 September 2011.
 Operation Parakram : 2000-2003 - counter insurgency operations
 Operation Rakshak : 2005-2009 - counter insurgency operations

Honours and awards
Personnel from the regiment have been awarded the following –
 Sena Medals – 5
 COAS Commendation Cards – 4
 GOC-in-C Commendation Cards – 7
 The regiment has produced five Generals and three Brigadiers

Motto
The motto of the regiment is Veluvom Veluvom Vetricondu Selluvom which translates to Victory, Victory, Ahead with Victory.

Notable personnel 
Brigadier Gurmeet Kanwal – He was commissioned into the regiment and was a noted author and strategic analyst.

See also
List of artillery regiments of Indian Army

References

Military units and formations established in 1965
Artillery regiments of the Indian Army after 1947